Caroline "Tottie" Goldsmith  (born 27 August 1962) is an Australian actress and singer. She is notably known as a founding member of the band Chantoozies.

Career

Television
In the early 1980s, Caroline Goldsmith acted in the Australian television series The Young Doctors, Starting Out, Prisoner, Saturdee, and The Henderson Kids . She made a guest appearance on an 1989 episode of Mission: Impossible, which was filmed in Australia.

In the 1990s Goldsmith hosted Sex/Life, a Network Ten program about sexual health, and starred in the drama series Fire. She was also a panellist on such programs as Beauty and the Beast and All-Star Squares.

Goldsmith made various guest appearances on Australian TV shows in the 2000s, including The Secret Life of Us, Bert's Family Feud, Big Questions, Surprise Surprise Gotcha, Pizza and Celebrity Singing Bee, and had a three episode run on Blue Heelers. In 2009, Goldsmith appeared on Neighbours for three months as Cassandra Freedman. She acted in two episodes of the Australian television show Swift and Shift Couriers. She appeared in the 2010 Australian film, Ricky! The Movie, as the ex-girlfriend of Ricky T, and as a gangster's girlfriend in the 2011 television film Underbelly Files: Infiltration. She also had a supporting role in the 2012 Jack Irish telefilm Bad Debts.

In 2022, Goldsmith appeared on the 8th season of the Australian version of I'm a Celebrity...Get Me Out of Here!

Music

From 1986 Goldsmith was one of four female lead vocalists of the Australian band the Chantoozies. They released four singles: "Witch Queen", "He's Gonna Step On You Again", "Wanna Be Up", "Kiss and Tell", and an album, Chantoozies. Goldsmith left the Chantoozies to pursue a solo singing career before the band released their second album, Gild the Lily in 1991. She later rejoined when the group temporarily reformed in 2006 for the Countdown Spectacular concert series, and more permanently in 2012. She again left the band in 2020.

With Chantoozies member Eve von Bibra, Goldsmith also performed in the duo the Toozies. The Toozies performed the opening act at the 2010 Antenna Awards.

On 8 January 2023, Goldsmith returned to music after a 3-year break, performing in St. Kilda with the "3XY Allstars".

Other work

In the late 1990s, Goldsmith co-hosted a breakfast program on Melbourne radio station TTFM, replacing Nicky Buckley. She played Janet in a season of the New Rocky Horror Show, and participated in an arena version of the musical Grease.

Goldsmith works as a marriage celebrant and has released two meditation and relaxation albums, Unwind Your Mind (2004) and Falling Asleep (2005). After having a bout of chronic fatigue syndrome and struggling for years with sleep issues, Goldsmith used her meditation skills in partnership with sleep specialist Chris Bunney to record Falling Asleep, which has since been prescribed by doctors. In 2007, she collaborated with a child psychologist on A Sleep Story, which is aimed at children.

She was known as a sex symbol early in her career, and posed nude for art magazine Black+White in August 1996.

Personal life
Goldsmith is the daughter of Melbourne restaurateur and nightclub owner Brian Goldsmith and British-born actress Rona Newton-John (1941–2013). Her great-grandfather, the father of her grandmother Irene, was German-Jewish physicist and Nobel Prize winner Max Born. 

Olivia Newton-John was her maternal aunt, while bassist Brett Goldsmith is her elder brother and racecar driver Emerson Newton-John her half brother. Her other siblings are Fiona, Jason, Sasha, Briony, Charlie and Elizabeth.

Goldsmith was married to skier Steven Lee and they had a daughter Layla. She became engaged to businessman James Mayo in January 2008.

A long-term resident of St Kilda in Melbourne, she moved to northern New South Wales in 2018.

Honours

In the 2020 Queen's Birthday Honours, Goldsmith was awarded the Medal of the Order of Australia (OAM) for "service to the community, and to the performing arts".

References

External links
 
 

1962 births
Living people
Recipients of the Medal of the Order of Australia
Australian women singers
Australian musical theatre actresses
Australian people of German-Jewish descent
Australian television actresses
Chantoozies members